The 1989–90 Southwest Independent Soccer League was an American indoor soccer season run by the Southwest Independent Soccer League during the winter of 1989-1990.

Regular season

Eastern Conference

Texas Division

Tex-Ark-Oma Division

Western Conference

Central Division

Cactus Division

Playoffs

Awards
MVP:  Andy Crawford, Permian Basin/Colorado
Top Scorer:  Enrique Serrano, Albuquerque Gunners
 Rookie of the Year:  Jose Miranda, Tucson Amigos
Coach of the year:  Peter Baralić, Phoenix Hearts

External links
United Soccer Leagues (RSSSF)
The Year in American Soccer - 1990

South
USISL indoor seasons
South